Minnesota State Highway 264 (MN 264) is a  highway in southwest Minnesota, which runs from its intersection with Nobles County State-Aid Highway 21 (2nd Avenue) in Round Lake and continues north to its northern terminus at its interchange with Interstate 90 and Jackson County State-Aid Highway 1, six miles east of Worthington.

Route description
Highway 264 serves as a north–south connector route in southwest Minnesota between Round Lake and Interstate 90.

The route runs along the county line for Nobles and Jackson counties for most of its length.

Highway 264 follows Amy Avenue and Main Street in Round Lake.

The route is legally defined as Route 264 in the Minnesota Statutes.

History
Highway 264 was authorized on July 1, 1949.

The route was paved in the mid-1950s.

Major intersections

References

*MnDOT. Nobles County General Highway Map. Accessed May 2, 2010.
*MnDOT. Jackson County General Highway Map. Accessed May 2, 2010.

264
Transportation in Nobles County, Minnesota
Transportation in Jackson County, Minnesota